Matysik is a surname. Notable people with the surname include:

 Kay Matysik (born 1980), German beach volleyball player
 Larry Matysik (1947–2018), American wrestling commentator and author
 Sylwia Matysik (born 1997), Polish footballer
 Waldemar Matysik (born 1961), Polish footballer

Polish-language surnames